W.L. Seaton Secondary is a public high school in Vernon, British Columbia, Canada, located near city centre. It is part of School District 22 Vernon. Seaton secondary is one of several high schools in the Vernon area.

External links
W.L. Seaton Secondary School
School District 22

1949 establishments in British Columbia
Educational institutions established in 1949
High schools in Vernon, British Columbia
Schools in the Okanagan